Denmark competed at the 2011 World Aquatics Championships in Shanghai, China between July 16 and 31, 2011.

Medalists

Swimming

Denmark qualified 6 swimmers.

Men

Women

References

Nations at the 2011 World Aquatics Championships
2011 in Danish sport
Denmark at the World Aquatics Championships